Stephen Kellogg and the Sixers were an American rock band formed in Western Massachusetts in 2003. The band features lead singer and founding member Stephen Kellogg (born November 28, 1976) piano and bass player Kit Karlson (born September 22, 1976), drummer Brian "Boots" Factor (born August 14, 1979), and electric guitar/pedal steel player Sam Getz (born October 17, 1983).  Chip Johnson (born February 10, 1983) joined Stephen Kellogg and the Sixers on bass in 2011.

General information
They have recorded albums for Universal Records, Everfine Records (a subsidiary of Atlantic Records) and Vanguard Records. Their album Glassjaw Boxer, recorded for Everfine Records, was named one of the top five albums of 2007 by USA Today critic Brian Mansfield.

Their release The Bear, Vanguard Records, was voted "Best of 2009" by No Depression and JamBase. Their single "Shady Esperanto & The Young Hearts" cracked the Billboard Top 20 for AAA. They were named 2009 Entertainers of the year by Armed Forces Entertainment.

Their song "Maria" was covered by Canadian country band Doc Walker and was a top 10 hit.

The band is also known for annual commitments to St. Jude Children's Hospital.

In 2009, the band recorded a music video of "Shady Esperanto & The Young Hearts" with the University of Massachusetts Minuteman Marching Band. Kit Karlson is a former member of said marching band.

Touring credits
Stephen Kellogg and the Sixers' on stage credits include tours with George Thorogood, Needtobreathe, Sugarland, Hanson, O.A.R., Josh Ritter, Dar Williams, David Crosby, Martin Sexton as well as an appearance with James Brown shortly before Brown's death. Noteworthy festival plays include 2006 Telluride BlueGrass Festival, 2008 Lyons Folk Festival, 2008 Mile High Festival, The 2007 All Good Festival and Multiple appearances on NPR's Mountain Stage featuring Larry Groce.

The band's touring history also includes several trips over seas to play for the United States Armed Forces.  They spent one month in the spring of 2009 playing on bases in nine different countries such as Kuwait and Bahrain as well as a trip to Israel to play for Israeli Prime Minister Benjamin Netanyahu.

Hiatus
After over twelve-hundred shows and nine years of playing together as a band 'Stephen Kellogg and the Sixers' went on hiatus at the end of November 2012. 
The band did a send off called "The Hi-Ate-US Tour" which consisted of a national tour of the country between October 17 and November 24.  Their final show of that tour was at Webster Hall in New York City.  They have no current plans for future tours.
As of December 2012 Stephen Kellogg has been touring extensively, having released his first solo album, Blunderstone Rookery in 2013. His second album, South, West, North, East was released in February 2016 and a greatest hits album, Tour De Forty: Greatest Hits so Far (Live), followed in 2017. His most recent work, Objects in the Mirror, was released in 2018.

Current band members
 Stephen "Skunk" Kellogg - lead vocals, acoustic guitar, electric guitar, harmonica, piano
 Kit "Goose" Karlson - bass guitar, keyboards (including keytar), accordion, tuba, backing vocals
 Brian "Boots" Factor - drums, backing vocals, mandolin, banjo
 Sam "Steamer" Getz - electric guitar, pedal steel guitar, bass, backing vocals
Chip Johnson - bass guitar, acoustic guitar, electric guitar, backing vocals

Former band members
 Chris Soucy - electric guitar, bass, vocals (2004–2007)- Now is the regional director of School of Rock Denver
 Kyle Riabko - electric guitar, bass, vocals (2007–2008) - Left band to pursue solo musical and Broadway interests.

Discography

Released with "The Sixers"
 Bulletproof Heart - 2004
 Stephen Kellogg and the Sixers - 2005 
 The First Waltz - 2006 - CD/DVD set
 Glassjaw Boxer - 2007
 The Bear - 2009
 Live from the Heart: 1000th Show, Irving Plaza, NYC - 2010
 Gift Horse - 2011

Stephen Kellogg solo releases
Stephen Kellogg
 Invest in Us - 1994
 Rain Summer - The Stephen Kellogg Band - 1995
 Buffalo - Stephen Kellogg and the Root Cellar Band - 1997
 South of Stephen - 2000
 Muskrats, Mullets & Mesh Caps - 2001
 The Early Hits (1992-1997) - 2002
 Lucky 11 - 2002
 Blunderstone Rookery - 2013
 South West North East - 2016
Tour De Forty: Greatest Hits (So Far) Live - 2017
 Objects In The Mirror - 2018

Other releases
Brian Factor
 "January Bridges" - 2006 
 "Dead Language Demos" - 2007 
 "Part or Execution" - 2010

Trevor Jackson
 Kyle Riabko and Boots Factor Are...- Trevor Jackson - 2008

Sam Getz
The Vig- "Around and Around and So On"- 2010
Welshley Arms- "Welcome" - 2013

Chip Johnson
This Winter Room- "Losing the Paper Moon" - 2011

Featured on
 The Letterbox EP - Heath Brandon - 2006 (Kit Karlson - bass)
* Time for Good - Todd Martin - 2005 (Kit Karlson - Bass, Factor -Percussion, Stephen Kellogg - Harmonica & Vocals)
* "Smoke"- Stepanian -2005 (Stephen Kellogg - Vocals)
*  "Mont Clare" - Todd Martin - 2007 (Kit Karlson - Bass, Factor - Percussion)

Songs appeared in
 One Tree Hill - October 2008 - Song: "Hearts in Pain"
One Tree Hill - 2009 - Song: "Born in the Spring"
 Mercy - 2009 - Song: "Shady Esperanto and the Young Hearts"
 Men of a Certain Age - Fall 2010 promotional advertisement - Song: "Shady Esperanto and the Young Hearts"

References

External links
 Stephen Kellogg's website
 Stephen Kellogg and the Sixers' Website
 Stephen Kellogg and the Sixers' Facebook
 Stephen Kellogg and the Sixers' (SK6ERS) Twitter

Musical groups from Massachusetts
Americana music groups
American folk rock musicians